Gen-Z for Change, formerly called TikTok for Biden, is an American non-profit advocacy organization founded in 2020 that uses social media to promote civil discourse and political action among members of Generation Z. It consists of a core team of 15–20 people and a coalition of over 500 content creators and activists, and partners with influencers, activists and celebrities to produce multimedia content. Its advocacy addresses a wide range of topics such as COVID-19, climate change, systemic inequity, foreign policy, voting rights, and LGBTQIA+ issues. Collectively, Gen-Z for Change's members have 540 million followers and receive 1.5 billion monthly views on social media.

Gen-Z for Change has received significant news coverage for its activities, including a one-hour briefing with the White House for 30 prominent TikTok content creators about the United States’ strategic goals regarding the war in Ukraine (which was parodied by Saturday Night Live), protests against companies such as Starbucks and Kroger for anti-union firings, and abortion-rights advocacy following the U.S. Supreme Court's decision to overturn Roe v. Wade in June 2022. Olivia Julianna, one of Gen-Z for Change's political strategists, raised more than $2 million in donations to abortion funds across the country through the organization after U.S. Representative Matt Gaetz ridiculed her appearance in July 2022.

History 

The organization's account on TikTok was created in October 2020 under the name TikTok for Biden, to support Joe Biden during the 2020 presidential election in the United States. The organization was renamed Gen-Z for Change in January 2021.

In early March 2022, the Presidency of Joe Biden enlisted Gen-Z for Change to help organize a briefing between senior administration officials and prominent social media influencers about the Russo-Ukrainian War.  The briefing was leaked to The Washington Post, which later inspired a sketch on NBC's comedy show Saturday Night Live. Prior to that, Gen-Z for Change partnered with the White House and United States Department of Health and Human Services to combat COVID-19 misinformation and promote vaccination efforts. Although the organization has regularly criticized the Biden Administration, some have worried about their close ties to each other.

See also

Members and associates 

 Aidan Kohn-Murphy
 Jack Petocz
 Elise Joshi
 Victoria Hammett
 Claire Simon
 Olivia Julianna
 Sam Shlafstein
 Sam Schmir
 Connor Hesse
 Nandi Perry
 Sofia Ongele

See also 
 Political views of Generation Z
 Generation Z in the United States
 Social media use in politics
 Youth activism
 Youth politics

References 

Generation Z
Social media campaigns
Social media influencers
Non-profit organizations based in the United States
Non-governmental organizations
Political advocacy groups in the United States
Political organizations established in 2020
Political youth organizations in the United States
Social justice organizations
TikTokers